DYTR (91.1 FM), broadcasting as 91.1 Balita FM, is a radio station owned and operated by Tagbilaran Broadcasting System. The station's studio and transmitter facilities are located at CAP Bldg., J. Borja St. cor. Carlos P. Garcia Ave., Tagbilaran.

History
The station was inaugurated in 1990 as True Radio 911 with a mass-based format. At that time, it was formerly affiliated with the ABS-CBN Corporation and contain former names "Star Radio Bohol", "ABS-CBN Radio Bohol", "ProStar Bohol" and then "MOR 91.1 Bohol" as a secondary brand. In 2017, it became an affiliate of Radio Mindanao Network. In November 2020, the station rebranded as Balita FM and added news and talk to its programming.

References

Radio stations established in 1990
Radio stations in Bohol